CIAC may refer to:

Athletic conferences
 Carolinas Intercollegiate Athletic Conference, southeastern United States
 Connecticut Interscholastic Athletic Conference
 Central Intercollegiate Athletic Conference, Kansas and Missouri

Other uses
 Clark International Airport Corporation, Pampanga, Philippines
 Community in a Cube, a housing development in Middlesbrough, United Kingdom
 Computer Incident Advisory Capability, at the United States Department of Energy
 CRACK International Art Camp, Rahimpur, Kushtia, Bangladesh